Júlio César Godinho Catole (ジュリーニョ | born 5 August 1986), commonly known as Julinho, is a Brazilian footballer who plays for São Bernardo. He primarily plays as a left back, but he could also play as a left wing back, left wide midfielder, or even as left winger.

Club statistics
Updated to 23 February 2018.

Honours
Avaí
Campeonato Catarinense: 2019

References

External links

Profile at Hokkaido Consadole Sapporo

1986 births
Living people
Footballers from São Paulo
Brazilian footballers
Association football defenders
Campeonato Brasileiro Série A players
Campeonato Brasileiro Série B players
Campeonato Brasileiro Série D players
Clube Atlético Hermann Aichinger players
Clube Atlético Metropolitano players
Avaí FC players
CR Vasco da Gama players
Sport Club do Recife players
Guarani FC players
Santa Cruz Futebol Clube players
Operário Ferroviário Esporte Clube players
Ascenso MX players
Altamira F.C. players
J1 League players
J2 League players
Hokkaido Consadole Sapporo players
Renofa Yamaguchi FC players
Brazilian expatriate footballers
Brazilian expatriate sportspeople in Mexico
Brazilian expatriate sportspeople in Japan
Expatriate footballers in Mexico
Expatriate footballers in Japan